Nepenthes of Borneo is a monograph by Charles Clarke on the tropical pitcher plants of Borneo. It was first published in 1997 by Natural History Publications (Borneo), and reprinted in 2006. Clarke describes it as "primarily an ecological monograph".

Content
The book describes and illustrates 31 species in detail. A further two "undescribed and incompletely diagnosed taxa" are included: Nepenthes sp. A (possibly a form of N. fusca) and Nepenthes sp. B (later described as N. hurrelliana). Six taxa are also covered under "dubious species and erroneous records": N. alata, N. gymnamphora, N. macfarlanei, and N. maxima (which are all shown to be absent from the island); N. sp. "elegance" (which is recognised as a variety of N. rafflesiana, was later described by Clarke and colleagues as N. baramensis, and is now recognised as N. hemsleyana); and N. neglecta (which Clarke suggests is a natural hybrid between N. gracilis and N. mirabilis). The monograph also provides brief descriptions of 16 selected natural hybrids.

The taxonomy presented in Nepenthes of Borneo almost wholly agrees with that of Matthew Jebb and Martin Cheek's 1997 monograph, "A skeletal revision of Nepenthes (Nepenthaceae)". Clarke makes only two major revisions: restoring N. faizaliana as a distinct species and sinking N. borneensis in synonymy with N. boschiana.

In the book's preface, Clarke writes:

My aim is to provide a balanced, first-hand account of the plants in an ecological context, partly based on the research I performed on them in Brunei in 1989 and 1990. This information is intended to complement the recent taxonomic revision of Nepenthes by M. Jebb and M. Cheek.

Species
The following taxa are covered in the book, with 31 recognised as valid species.

 N. albomarginata
 N. ampullaria
 N. bicalcarata
 N. boschiana
 N. burbidgeae
 N. campanulata
 N. clipeata
 N. edwardsiana
 N. ephippiata
 N. faizaliana
 N. fusca
 N. gracilis
 N. hirsuta
 N. hispida
 N. lowii
 N. macrophylla
 N. macrovulgaris
 N. mapuluensis
 N. mirabilis
 N. mollis
 N. muluensis
 N. murudensis
 N. northiana
 N. pilosa
 N. rafflesiana
 N. rajah
 N. reinwardtiana
 N. stenophylla
 N. tentaculata
 N. veitchii
 N. villosa

Dubious species and erroneous records
 N. alata
 N. sp. "elegance" (N. hemsleyana)
 N. gymnamphora
 N. macfarlanei
 N. maxima
 N. neglecta

Undescribed and incompletely diagnosed taxa
 N. sp. A (?N. fusca)
 N. sp. B (N. hurrelliana)

Reviews
Barry Meyers-Rice reviewed Nepenthes of Borneo in the December 1998 issue of the Carnivorous Plant Newsletter. He described the work as a "good, solid book that treats its subject very well". Rice praised the publication's habitat photographs and wrote that the "[c]ontent that really makes this book interesting and different from other carnivorous plant books is its emphasis on the context of Nepenthes in its natural habitat".

Nepenthes of Borneo was also reviewed by Miroslav Holub and Zdeněk Žáček in a 1998 issue of Trifid and Martin Spousta in a 2008 issue of Trifid Interinfo.

References

Nepenthes literature
1997 non-fiction books
1997 in biology